San Gabriel Chilac is the municipal seat of San Gabriel Chilac Municipality in the Mexican state of Puebla. It is located near the city of Tehuacán.

Populated places in Puebla